The 31st Directors Guild of America Awards, honoring the outstanding directorial achievements in film and television in 1978, were presented on March 10, 1979 at the Beverly Hilton. The feature film nominees were announced in February 1979.

Winners and nominees

Film

Television

References

External links
 

Directors Guild of America Awards
1978 film awards
1978 television awards
Direct
Direct
Directors
1979 in Los Angeles
March 1979 events in the United States